The  were an ancient ethnicity that lived in the Japanese archipelago during the Yayoi period (300 BCE–300 CE) and are characterized through Yayoi material culture. Some argue for an earlier start of the Yayoi period, between 1000 and 800 BCE, but this date is controversial. The people of the Yayoi culture are regarded as the spreaders of agriculture and the Japonic languages throughout the whole archipelago, and were characterized by both local Jōmon hunter-gatherers and Mainland Asian migrant ancestries.

Origin
The terms Yayoi and Wajin can be used interchangeably, though "Wajin" (倭人) refers to the people of Wa and "Wajin" (和人) is another name for the modern Yamato people.

The definition of the Yayoi people is complex: The term Yayoi people describes both farmers and hunter-gatherers exclusively living in the Japanese archipelago, and their agricultural transition. The Yayoi people refers specifically to the mixed descedants of Jomon hunter-gatherers with Mainland Asian migrants, which adopted (rice) agriculture and other continental material culture.

There are several hypotheses about the geographic origin of the Mainland Asian migrants:
 immigrants from the Southern or Central Korean Peninsula
 immigrants from Jiangnan near the Yangtze River Delta in ancient China
 multiple origins from various regions of Asia, including Southeast Asia

According to Alexander Vovin, the Yayoi were present on the central and southern parts of the Korean Peninsula before they were displaced and assimilated by arriving proto-Koreans. A similar view was raised by Whitman (2012), further noting that the Yayoi are not closely related to the proto-Koreanic speakers and that Koreanic arrived later from Manchuria to the Korean peninsula at around 300 BCE and coexisted with the Japonic-speakers. Both had influence on each other and a later founder effect diminished the internal variety of both language families.

Genetics 
To date, not much genetic data has been revealed about the Yayoi people. Two samples of "Northwestern Yayoi" from the Shimomotoyama site in northern Kyushu, in the Nagasaki Prefecture, have been analyzed and displayed mixed ancestry with a majority being derived from the local Jōmon hunter-gatherers, and varying degrees of Eastern Asian admixture. Geneticists have called for a reinterpretation of the Yayoi people, which did not replace the hunter-gatherer populations of the Jōmon period, but emerged through admixture and hunter-gatherers adopting agriculture and material culture from Mainland Asia through transition. Genetic testing on Neolithic to Bronze Age samples from the southern Korean peninsula revealed varying degrees of Jōmon ancestry, which ranges from around 10 to 95%. In contrast, modern Koreans have only little amounts of Jōmon ancestry or may lack it completely. Based on studies on modern Japanese people, the Yayoi component makes up the majority ancestry of Japanese. Another DNA analysis of four Yayoi remains revealed that the "immigrant Yayoi people were already mixed with the indigenous Jōmon people". The authors noted that "it is necessary to rethink the traditional theory of the formation of the Japanese population". The formation of the Japanese people and their culture is rooted in the local Jōmon hunter-gatherers which adopted Mainland Asian material culture and mixed with continental Asian immigrants, rather than being replaced. The Yayoi people represent the period of transition and formation of "Old Japanese" and their culture before receiving further influence from continental East Asia during the Kofun period.

Language

See also
Japanese people
Yayoi culture

Notes

References

Archaeology of Japan
Tribes of ancient Japan
Yayoi period